Invasive species include those introduced from overseas, such as the red-eared slider, as well as plants or animals introduced outside their native range within Japan (Siberian chipmunk, etc.). This is a non-exhaustive list, largely based on data from the National Institute of Environmental Studies.

Animal species

Mammals
 Bos taurus (cattle) - Problematic in Tokara Islands 
 Callosciurus erythraeus (Pallas's squirrel) - Invasive in various areas in Japan.
 Callosciurus finlaysonii (Finlayson's squirrel) - Invasive in Shizuoka prefecture.
 Canis lupus (dog) 
 Capra aegagrus (feral goat) 
 Erinaceus amurensis (Amur hedgehog) 
 Eutamias sibiricus (Siberian chipmunk) - Native in Hokkaido, invasive in Honshu.
 Felis silvestris (feral cat) 
 Macaca cyclopis (Formosan rock macaque) 
 Macaca mulatta (rhesus macaque) 
 Martes melampus (Japanese marten) 
 Muntiacus reevesi (Reeves's muntjac) 
 Mus musculus (house mouse) - Nationwide.
 Mustela itatsi (Japanese weasel) 
 Mustela sibirica (Siberian weasel) 
 Myocastor coypus (coypu, nutria) - Western Japan.
 Neogale vison (American mink) 
 Nyctereutes procyonoides (raccoon dog) 
 Ondatra zibethicus (muskrat) - Tokyo, Chiba and Saitama.
 Oryctolagus cuniculus (European rabbit) 
 Paguma larvata (masked palm civet) 
 Procyon lotor (raccoon) 
 Rattus norvegicus (Norwegian rat) - Invasive on outlying islands.
 Rattus rattus (black rat) - Invasive in almost all of Japan.
 Sus scrofa (wild boar) 
Urva auropunctata (small Asian mongoose) - Okinawa and Kagoshima.

Reptiles
 Anolis carolinensis (Carolina anole) 
 Chelydra serpentina (common snapping turtle) 
 Cuora flavomarginata (Chinese box turtle) 
 Gekko hokouensis (Hokou gecko) 
 Hemidactylus frenatus (common house gecko) 
 Lepidodactylus lugubris (mourning gecko) 
 Orthriophis taeniurus (beauty rat snake) 
 Pelodiscus sinensis (Chinese softshell turtle) 
 Trachemys scripta (red-eared slider) 
 Protobothrops elegans (elegant pitviper) 
 Protobothrops mucrosquamatus (brown spotted pit viper) 
 Diploderma swinhonis (tree lizard)

Birds
 Columba livia (feral pigeon)
 Leiothrix lutea (red-billed leiothrix) 
 Pavo cristatus (Indian peafowl) 
 Phasianus colchicus (common pheasant) 
 Pycnonotus sinensis (light-vented bulbul)

Fish
 Acheilognathus cyanostigma (striped bitterling) 
 Acheilognathus macropterus 
 Acheilognathus rhombeus (kanehira) 
 Acheilognathus typus (zenitanago) 
 Channa argus (northern snakehead) 
 Clarias batrachus (walking catfish)
 Ctenopharyngodon idella (grass carp) 
 Cyprinus carpio (common carp) 
 Gambusia affinis (mosquitofish) 
 Gambusia holbrooki (eastern mosquitofish) 
 Ictalurus punctatus (channel catfish) 
 Lepomis macrochirus (bluegill) 
 Micropterus dolomieu (smallmouth bass) 
 Micropterus salmoides (largemouth bass) 
 Monopterus albus (Asian swamp eel) 
 Oncorhynchus mykiss (rainbow trout) 
 Rhodeus ocellatus (rosy bitterling) 
 Salmo trutta (brown trout) 
 Silurus asotus (Amur catfish) 
 Tridentiger brevispinis (numachichibu)

Invertebrates
 Aculops lycopersici (tomato russet mite) 
 Agriosphodrus dohrni 
 Ambigolimax valentianus (threeband gardenslug) 
 Amphibalanus amphitrite (striped barnacle) 
 Amphibalanus improvisus (bay barnacle) 
 Anoplolepis gracilipes (yellow crazy ant) 
 Aromia bungii (red-necked longhorn) 
 Bemisia tabaci (silverleaf whitefly) 
 Blattella germanica (German cockroach) 
 Bombus terrestris (buff-tailed bumblebee) 
 Bugula neritina (brown bryozoan) 
 Bursaphelenchus xylophilus (pine wood nematode) 
 Caverelius saccharivorus (oriental chinch bug) 
 Chamberlinius hualinensis 
 Coptotermes formosanus (Formosan subterranean termite) 
 Corbicula fluminea (Asian clam) 
 Corythucha ciliata (sycamore lace bug) 
 Crangonyx floridanus (Florida crangonyctid) 
 Crepidula fornicata (common slipper shell) 
 Crepidula onyx (onyx slippersnail) 
 Cylas formicarius (sweet potato weevil) 
 Delta pyriforme 
 Drosophila suzukii (spotted wing drosophila) 
 Dryocosmus kuriphilus (chestnut gall wasp) 
 Epilachna varivestis (Mexican bean beetle) 
 Euglandina rosea (rosy wolfsnail) 
 Euscepes postfasciatus (West Indian sweetpotato weevil) 
 Frankliniella occidentalis (western flower thrips) 
 Globodera rostochiensis (golden nematode) 
 Hydroides elegans 
 Hylurgus ligniperda (red-haired pine bark beetle) 
 Hypera postica (alfalfa weevil) 
 Hyphantria cunea (fall webworm) 
 Icerya purchasi (cottony cushion scale) 
 Latrodectus geometricus (brown widow) 
 Latrodectus hasseltii (redback spider) 
 Limnoperna fortunei (golden mussel) 
 Linepithema humile (Argentine ant) 
 Liriomyza sativae (vegetable leaf miner) 
 Liriomyza trifolii (serpentine leafminer) 
 Lissachatina fulica (giant African snail) 
 Lissorhoptrus oryzophilus (rice water weevil) 
 Monomorium pharaonis (pharaoh ant) 
 Mytilus galloprovincialis (Mediterranean mussel) 
 Nassarius sinarus (Nassarius snail) 
 Nealsomyia rufella 
 Opisthoplatia orientalis 
 Pacifastacus leniusculus (signal crayfish) 
 Paraglenea fortunei 
 Parasa lepida (nettle caterpillar) 
 Perna viridis (Asian green mussel) 
 Pheidole megacephala (big-headed ant) 
 Platydemus manokwari (New Guinea flatworm) 
 Polyandrocarpa zorritensis 
 Pomacea canaliculata (apple snail)
 Potamopyrgus antipodarum (New Zealand mud snail) 
 Procambarus clarkii (red swamp crawfish) 
 Pyromaia tuberculata (tuberculate pear crab) 
 Quadrastichus erythrinae (Erythrina gall wasp) 
 Rhabdoscelus obscurus (sugarcane weevil borer) 
 Rhynchophorus ferrugineus (red palm weevil) 
 Solenopsis geminata (fire ant) 
 Thrips palmi (melon thrips) 
 Trialeurodes vaporariorum (glasshouse whitefly) 
 Unaspis yanonensis (arrowhead snow scale) 
 Vespa velutina (Asian predatory wasp) 
 Xyleborus volvulus 
 Xenostrobus securis (small brown mussel)

Plant species
 Desmodium paniculatum

References

Japan
Environmental issues in Japan
Fauna of Japan
Flora of Japan
Invasive